Borkou Yala is a department of Borkou Region in Chad.  It was created by Order No. 002 / PR / 08 of 19 February 2008. Its chief town is Kirdimi.

Subdivisions 
The department of Borkou Yala is divided into two sub-prefectures:

 Kirdimi
 Yarda.

Administration 
Administrator:

 Prefects of Borkou Yala (since 2008):

 October 9, 2008: Choua Hemchi.

References 

Departments of Chad